Mărunțișu may refer to several villages in Romania:

 Mărunțișu, a village in the town of Pătârlagele, Buzău County
 Mărunțișu, a village in Costeștii din Vale Commune, Dâmbovița County